This is a list of people from the Royal Borough of Kensington and Chelsea, England, who have become known internationally in different roles and professions. The Royal Borough of Kensington and Chelsea is a central London borough of Royal borough status. After the City of Westminster, it is the wealthiest borough in England.

Freddie Adkins
John Wall Callcott
Cyril Chadwick
Frederic Chancellor
Arthur Cullin
Coningsby Disraeli
Paul Drayson, Baron Drayson
Marc Fitch
Nicholas Freeman
Joan Hanham, Baroness Hanham
Letitia Elizabeth Landon, poet
Conrad Lant, bassist/vocalist for heavy metal band Venom
Lakshmi Mittal
Stephen Poliakoff
Robin Renwick, Baron Renwick of Clifton
Shireen Ritchie, Baroness Ritchie
Nicholas Scott
George Smith
Tim Woodward

References

People from the Royal Borough of Kensington and Chelsea
Kensington and Chelsea